John Finley Baldwin Jr. (June 28, 1915 – March 9, 1966) was an American lawyer, military officer, and politician who served as a U.S. Representative from California from 1955 to 1966.

Early life 
Born in Oakland, California, in 1915 to John Finley Baldwin and Nellie Linekin, John F. Baldwin Jr. graduated from San Ramon Valley High School located in Danville, California. He then went on to UC Berkeley where he majored in accounting and finance. He graduated from UC Berkeley in 1935 and soon after he became the assistant manager of South-Western Publishing Co.

John and Mary were married at the Presidio of San Francisco in December 1944 while he was a Major in the Army and Mary was a secretary.

Career 
Baldwin joined the United States Army in 1941 and served in the area of finance, first as a training director at the Army Finance School and later with the Office of Fiscal Director. By the time of his retirement in 1946, he had attained the rank of lieutenant-colonel.

He then returned to school to study law, graduating from the University of California Boalt Hall School of Law in 1949.

He was elected as a Republican in 1954, and served from January 3, 1955, until his death from cancer at Bethesda Naval Hospital on March 9, 1966, aged 50. Baldwin voted in favor of the Civil Rights Acts of 1957, 1960, and 1964, as well as the 24th Amendment to the U.S. Constitution and the Voting Rights Act of 1965.

Legacy 
John F. Baldwin Elementary School, in Danville, was named after him. John F. Baldwin Park in Concord was also established to honor him.
John F. Baldwin Shipping Channel is named after him.

See also
 List of United States Congress members who died in office (1950–99)

References

External links

1915 births
1966 deaths
20th-century American lawyers
20th-century American politicians
Burials in Contra Costa County, California
California lawyers
Deaths from cancer in Maryland
Haas School of Business alumni
People from Danville, California
Republican Party members of the United States House of Representatives from California
San Francisco Bay Area politicians
UC Berkeley School of Law alumni
United States Army officers
Military personnel from California